Lake Chippewa was a prehistoric proglacial lake. The basin is now Lake Michigan.  It formed about 10,600 years before present (YBP). The lake occupied the depression left by the Michigan Lobe of the Laurentide Ice Sheet.

Origin

The lake formed from glacial Lake Algonquin as water levels dropped, occupying only the deepest parts of the Lake Michigan basin. The waters drained through the Straits of Mackinac, then across Lake Stanley into either Lake Hough and then to the St. Lawrence River by way of the Ottawa River valley, or through the St. Clair and Detroit rivers to an Early Lake Erie and out the Niagara River towards the St. Lawrence.  Around 10,300 YBP, Lake Chippewa’s levels continued to drop, and the basin was a self-contained body of water without an outlet. Levels returned and Lake Chippewa again flowed through the canyon at Mackinac until around 7,500 YBP.  At that time, the Nipissing Great Lakes merged with the waters in the Michigan Basin and created a single lake encompassing all three of the upper Great Lakes.

Size
Somewhat smaller than Lake Michigan, Lake Chippewa extended through the most of the Michigan Basin, north to the Straits of Mackinac, where there was a narrow channel which conveyed the lake's outflow over the now submerged Mackinac Falls to Lake Stanley.  Its shoreline ranged from  out from the present day Lake Michigan shore.

See also
Lake Chicago

References

External links
 

Moraines of the United States
Geological history of the Great Lakes
Geology of Illinois
Geology of Michigan
Geology of Wisconsin